This pages lists retired numbers which sports teams or bodies have withdrawn as a tribute, usually to a former player.  The list is ordered by number.

00

National Basketball Association (NBA)
The Boston Celtics, for Hall of Famer Robert Parish.
The San Antonio Spurs, for Johnny Moore.

1

Major League Baseball (MLB)
 The Boston Red Sox, for Hall of Famer Bobby Doerr.
 The Cincinnati Reds, for manager Fred Hutchinson.
 The Los Angeles Dodgers, for Hall of Famer Pee Wee Reese.
 The Milwaukee Brewers, for Hall of Famer and former owner, Bud Selig.
 The New York Yankees, for Billy Martin, who both played for and managed the team.
 The Philadelphia Phillies, for Hall of Famer Richie Ashburn.
 The Pittsburgh Pirates, for manager Billy Meyer.
 The St. Louis Cardinals, for Hall of Famer Ozzie Smith.

NBA
 The Boston Celtics, for founding owner Walter Brown, a member of the Hall of Fame as a contributor.
 The Milwaukee Bucks, for Hall of Fame player Oscar Robertson.
 The Portland Trail Blazers, for founding owner Larry Weinberg. Unlike most numbers so honored, this number remains in circulation for players.
 The Sacramento Kings, for Hall of Fame player Nate Archibald, honoring the number's retirement when the team was known as the Kansas City Kings.
 The Seattle SuperSonics, for Gus Williams.
 The Utah Jazz, for Frank Layden, who served the team first as head coach and then as president.

National Football League (NFL)
 The New York Giants, for Hall of Famer Ray Flaherty.
 The Tennessee Titans, for Hall of Famer Warren Moon, who played for the team in its past incarnation as the Houston Oilers.

National Hockey League (NHL)
 The Chicago Blackhawks, for Hall of Famer Glenn Hall.
 The Detroit Red Wings, for Hall of Famer Terry Sawchuk.
 The Minnesota Wild, for their fans.
 The Montreal Canadiens, for Hall of Famer Jacques Plante.
 The New York Rangers, for Hall of Famer Eddie Giacomin.
 The Philadelphia Flyers, for Hall of Famer Bernie Parent.
 The Toronto Maple Leafs, for Hall of Famers Johnny Bower and Turk Broda.

Nippon Professional Baseball
 The Yomiuri Giants of Tokyo, for Sadaharu Oh.

2

FIA
 Rothman Williams Renault teams, for Ayrton Senna, after his death from injuries sustained in the 1994 San Marino Grand Prix.
 All FIA European Formula 3000 Championship team, for Alex Nannini, after his death from injuries sustained in the 1994 Imola Formula 3000 European Championship round

Handball-Bundesliga
 The THW Kiel, for Magnus Wislander, IHF World Player of the Year in 1990 and Player of the 20th Century

MLB
 The Chicago White Sox, for Hall of Famer Nellie Fox.
 The Detroit Tigers, for Hall of Famer Charlie Gehringer.
 The Los Angeles Dodgers, for Hall of Famer Tommy Lasorda.
 The New York Yankees, for Hall of Famer Derek Jeter.

NHL
 The Boston Bruins, for Hall of Famer Eddie Shore.
 The Buffalo Sabres, for Hall of Famer Tim Horton.
 The Carolina Hurricanes, for Glen Wesley
 The Hartford Whalers, for Rick Ley. The number was returned to circulation after the franchise moved to North Carolina in 1997.
 The Montreal Canadiens, for Hall of Famer Doug Harvey.
 The New York Rangers, for Hall of Famer Brian Leetch.
 The Philadelphia Flyers, for Hall of Famer Mark Howe.
 The St. Louis Blues, for Hall of Famer Al MacInnis.

Finland Ice Hockey Liiga
 The Tappara, for Kalevi Numminen.

Kontinental Hockey League
 The HC CSKA Moscow, for Viacheslav Fetisov.

Sweden Ice Hockey League
 The Karlstad Färjestad BK, for Tommy Samuelsson.

3

Association football 
 Al Ahly of Egypt, for defender Mohamed Abdelwahab, who died in 2006 during a club training session.
 Atlante of Mexico, for longtime goalkeeper Federico Vilar.
 Internazionale of Italy, for longtime defender Giacinto Facchetti, who went on to serve as club president and died in that office.
 Milan of Italy, for longtime defender Paolo Maldini.
 Sturm Graz of Austria, for longtime defender Günther Neukirchner.

Handball 
 The Rhein-Neckar Löwen, for Uwe Gensheimer, was the captain when they won their first Championship.
 The Veszprém KC of Hungary, for Péter Gulyás.

MLB
 The Atlanta Braves, for Dale Murphy.
 The Chicago White Sox, for Harold Baines.
 The Cleveland Guardians, for Hall of Famer Earl Averill.
 The Detroit Tigers, for Hall of Famer Alan Trammell.
 The Minnesota Twins, for Hall of Famer Harmon Killebrew.
 The New York Yankees, for Hall of Famer Babe Ruth.
 The San Francisco Giants, for Hall of Famer Bill Terry, who played for the team when it was based in New York City.

MLS
 The Portland Timbers, for Clive Charles.

NBA
 The Boston Celtics, for Hall of Famer Dennis Johnson.
 The New Jersey Nets, for Hall of Famer Dražen Petrović.
 The Miami Heat in honor of Dwyane Wade.

NFL
 The Chicago Bears, for Hall of Famer Bronko Nagurski.
 The Green Bay Packers, for Hall of Famer Tony Canadeo.
 The Kansas City Chiefs, for Hall of Famer Jan Stenerud.

NHL
 The Boston Bruins, for Lionel Hitchman.
 The Carolina Hurricanes, unofficially retired for Steve Chiasson.
 The Chicago Blackhawks, for Keith Magnuson and Hall of Famer Pierre Pilote.
 The Edmonton Oilers, for Al Hamilton.
 The Montreal Canadiens, for Hall of Famer Émile Bouchard.
 The New Jersey Devils, for Ken Daneyko.
 The New York Rangers, for Hall of Famer Harry Howell.
 The Quebec Nordiques, for J. C. Tremblay. The number was returned to circulation after the franchise moved to Colorado in 1995.
 The St. Louis Blues, for Bob Gassoff.

Finland Ice Hockey Liiga
 The Tappara, for Pekka Marjamäki.
 The HC TPS of Turku, for Timo Nummelin.

Nippon Professional Baseball
 The Hiroshima Carp, for Sachio Kinugasa.
 The Yomiuri Giants of Tokyo, for Shigeo Nagashima.

4

MLB
 The Baltimore Orioles, for Hall of Fame manager Earl Weaver.
 The Boston Red Sox, for Hall of Famer Joe Cronin.
 The Chicago White Sox, for Hall of Famer Luke Appling.
 The Los Angeles Dodgers, for Hall of Famer Duke Snider.
 The Milwaukee Brewers, for Hall of Famer Paul Molitor.
 The New York Giants, for Hall of Famer Mel Ott.
 The New York Yankees, for Hall of Famer Lou Gehrig. Notably, he was the first player in major North American sports to be so honored by a U.S.-based team (he was preceded in this honor by Ace Bailey, whose #6 was retired by the Toronto Maple Leafs five years earlier).
 The Pittsburgh Pirates, for Hall of Famer Ralph Kiner.

NBA
 The Chicago Bulls, for Jerry Sloan, who later served as the team's head coach and went on to a Hall of Fame career in that role (mainly with the Utah Jazz).
 The Detroit Pistons, for Hall of Fame player Joe Dumars, who later served as team president.
 The Milwaukee Bucks, for Sidney Moncrief.
 The Sacramento Kings, for Chris Webber.
 The Utah Jazz, for Hall of Fame player Adrian Dantley.

NFL
 The Green Bay Packers, for Hall of Famer Brett Favre.
 The New York Giants, for Hall of Famer Tuffy Leemans.

NHL
 The Boston Bruins, for Hall of Famer Bobby Orr.
 The Detroit Red Wings, for Hall of Famer Red Kelly.
 The Los Angeles Kings, for Hall of Famer Rob Blake.
 The Montreal Canadiens, for Hall of Famer Jean Béliveau.
 The New Jersey Devils, for Hall of Famer Scott Stevens.
 The Philadelphia Flyers, for Barry Ashbee.
 The Tampa Bay Lightning, for Vincent Lecavalier.
 The Toronto Maple Leafs for Hall of Famers Hap Day and Red Kelly.

China Basketball Association
 The Guangdong Southern Tigers, for Du Feng.

Basketball Bundesliga of Germany
 The Alba Berlin, for Henrik Rödl.

Greece Basketball League
 The Panathinaikos B.C., for Fragiskos Alvertis.

Hungary Nemzeti Handball League
 The Veszprém KC, for Gergő Iváncsik.

Lega Basket Serie A of Italy
 The Virtus Bologna, for Roberto Brunamonti.

Spain Basketball Liga
 The FC Barcelona Basquet, for Andrés Jiménez.

Spain Handball ASOBAL League
 The FC Barcelona Handbol, for Xavier O'Callaghan.

5

CFL
 The BC Lions, for Lui Passaglia.
 The Calgary Stampeders, for Harry Hood.

MLB
 The Baltimore Orioles, for Hall of Famer Brooks Robinson.
 The Cincinnati Reds for Willard Hershberger and later for Hall of Famer Johnny Bench.
 The Cleveland Guardians, for Hall of Famer Lou Boudreau.
 The Detroit Tigers, for Hall of Famer Hank Greenberg.
 The Florida Marlins for their first president Carl Barger.
 The Houston Astros, for Hall of Famer Jeff Bagwell.
 The Kansas City Royals, for Hall of Famer George Brett.
 The New York Yankees, for Hall of Famer Joe DiMaggio.

NBA
 The Phoenix Suns, for Dick Van Arsdale.

NFL
 The Chicago Bears, for Hall of Famer George McAfee.
 The Philadelphia Eagles, for Donovan McNabb.

NHL
 The Boston Bruins, for Hall of Famer Dit Clapper.
 The Detroit Red Wings, for Hall of Famer Nicklas Lidström.
 The Montreal Canadiens, for Hall of Famers Bernie Geoffrion and Guy Lapointe.
 The New York Islanders, for Hall of Famer Denis Potvin.
 The St. Louis Blues, for Bob Plager.
 The Toronto Maple Leafs, for Bill Barilko.
 The Washington Capitals, for Hall of Famer Rod Langway.

Lega Basket Serie A of Italy
 The Virtus Bologna, for Predrag Danilovic.

Lithuania Basketball League
 The BC Žalgiris for Modestas Paulauskas.

Spain Handball ASOBAL League
 The FC Barcelona Handbol, for Enric Masip.

Sweden Ice Hockey League
 The Karlstad Färjestad BK, for Håkan Loob.

6

Association football
 A.C. Milan, for captain Franco Baresi.

Handball-Bundesliga
 The TBV Lemgo, for László Marosi.

MLB
 The Atlanta Braves, for manager Bobby Cox.
 The Boston Red Sox, for Johnny Pesky.
 The Detroit Tigers, for Hall of Famer Al Kaline.
 The Minnesota Twins, for Tony Oliva.
 The New York Yankees, for manager Joe Torre.
 The St. Louis Cardinals, for Hall of Famer Stan Musial.
 The San Diego Padres, for Steve Garvey.

NBA
 The Boston Celtics and all NBA teams, for Hall of Famer Bill Russell.
 The Orlando Magic, for their fans (the "sixth man").
 The Philadelphia 76ers, for Hall of Famer Julius Erving.
 The Phoenix Suns, for Walter Davis.
 The Sacramento Kings, for their fans.

NFL
 The Kansas City Chiefs, for Warren McVea.

NHL
 The Detroit Red Wings, unofficially retired for Larry Aurie.
 The Toronto Maple Leafs, for Hall of Famer Ace Bailey.

Greece Basketball League
 The Aris of Thessaloniki, for Nikos Galis.

Hungary Nemzeti Handball League
 The Veszprém KC, for József Éles.

Basketball Super League of Turkey
 The Fenerbahçe Basketball, for Mirsad Türkcan.

7

MLB
 The Houston Astros, for Hall of Famer Craig Biggio.
 The New York Yankees, for Hall of Famer Mickey Mantle.
 The Texas Rangers, for Hall of Famer Iván Rodríguez.
 The Minnesota Twins, for Joe Mauer.

NBA
 The Cleveland Cavaliers, for Bingo Smith.
 The New Orleans Hornets, for Hall of Famer Pete Maravich of the New Orleans Jazz.
 The Phoenix Suns, for Kevin Johnson.
 The Utah Jazz, also for Pete Maravich.

NFL
 The Chicago Bears, for Hall of Fame player, coach, and owner George Halas.
 The Denver Broncos, for Hall of Famer John Elway.
 The Detroit Lions, for Hall of Famer Dutch Clark.
 The Los Angeles Rams, for Hall of Famer Bob Waterfield.
 The New York Giants, for Hall of Famer Mel Hein.

NHL
 The Arizona Coyotes, for Keith Tkachuk.
 The Boston Bruins, for Hall of Famer Phil Esposito.
 The Buffalo Sabres, for Rick Martin.
 The Dallas Stars, for Neal Broten.
 The Detroit Red Wings, for Hall of Famer Ted Lindsay.
 The Edmonton Oilers, for Hall of Famer Paul Coffey.
 The Montreal Canadiens, for Hall of Famer Howie Morenz.
 The New York Rangers, for Hall of Famer Rod Gilbert.
 The Philadelphia Flyers, for Hall of Famer Bill Barber.
 The Toronto Maple Leafs, for Hall of Famers King Clancy and Tim Horton.
 The Washington Capitals, for Yvon Labre.

Czech Republic Ice Hockey League
 The HC Slavia Praha, for Petr Kadlec.

Finland Ice Hockey Liiga
 The Tappara, for Timo Jutila.

Argentine Basketball League
The Asociación Deportiva Atenas of Córdova, for Bruno Lábaque.
The Quilmes de Mar del Plata, for Esteban De la Fuente.

France Basketball League
The Limoges CSP, for Richard Dacoury.

Hungary Nemzeti Handball League
 The Veszprém KC, for István Gulyás.

South Korea Baseball League
 The Gwangju Kia Tigers, for Lee Jong-beom.

Spain Basketball Liga
 The FC Barcelona Basquet, for Nacho Solozábal.

Spain Handball ASOBAL League
 The FC Barcelona Handbol, for Iñaki Urdangarin.

Basketball Super League of Turkey
 The Anadolu Efes of Istanbul, for Petar Naumoski.
 The Fenerbahçe Basketball, for Omer Onan.

8

Israeli Premier League (Association football)
 Maccabi Tel Aviv, for Avi Nimni.

MLB
 The Baltimore Orioles, for Hall of Famer Cal Ripken Jr.
 The Boston Red Sox, for Hall of Famer Carl Yastrzemski.
 The Cincinnati Reds, for Hall of Famer Joe Morgan.
 The Montreal Expos and Washington Nationals, for Hall of Famer Gary Carter.
 The New York Yankees, for Hall of Famers Yogi Berra and Bill Dickey.
 The Pittsburgh Pirates, for Hall of Famer Willie Stargell.

NBA
 The Los Angeles Lakers, for Kobe Bryant.

NFL
 The Dallas Cowboys, unofficially for Hall of Famer Troy Aikman.
 The New Orleans Saints unofficially for Archie Manning.
 The St. Louis Cardinals and Arizona Cardinals, for Hall of Famer Larry Wilson.
 The San Francisco 49ers, for Hall of Famer Steve Young.

NHL
 The Anaheim Ducks, for Hall of Famer Teemu Selänne.
 The Boston Bruins, for Hall of Famer Cam Neely.
 The Minnesota North Stars and Dallas Stars, for Bill Goldsworthy.
 The Ottawa Senators, for Frank Finnigan.
 The Quebec Nordiques, for Marc Tardif. The number was returned to circulation after the franchise moved to Colorado in 1995.
 The St. Louis Blues, for Barclay Plager.

Nippon Professional Baseball
 The Hiroshima Carp, for Kōji Yamamoto.

Argentine Basketball League
 The Peñarol de Mar del Plata, for Tato Rodríguez. 
 The Quilmes de Mar del Plata, for Guillermo Garcia Oyaga.

China Basketball Association
 The Guangdong Southern Tigers, for Zhu Fangyu.

Czech Republic Ice Hockey League
 The HC Slavia Praha, for Michal Sup.

Finland Ice Hockey Liiga
 The Tappara, for Janne Ojanen.
 The HC TPS of Turku, for Juhani Wahlsten.

Lega Basket Serie A of Italy
 The Olimpia Milano, for Mike D'Antoni.

Basketball League of Serbia
 The Crvena Zvezda of Belgrade, for Igor Rakočević.

Spain Handball ASOBAL League
 The FC Barcelona Handbol, for Víctor Tomás González.

9

MLB
 The Boston Red Sox, for Hall of Famer Ted Williams.
 The Chicago White Sox, for Minnie Miñoso.
 The New York Yankees, for Roger Maris.
 The Oakland Athletics, for Hall of Famer Reggie Jackson.
 The Pittsburgh Pirates, for Hall of Famer Bill Mazeroski.
 The St. Louis Cardinals, for Hall of Famer Enos Slaughter.

NBA
 The Atlanta Hawks, for Hall of Famer Bob Pettit.
 The Phoenix Suns, for Dan Majerle.
 The San Antonio Spurs, for Tony Parker.
 The Utah Jazz, for owner Larry Miller.

NHL
 The Anaheim Ducks, for Hall of Famer Paul Kariya.
 The Boston Bruins, for Hall of Famer Johnny Bucyk.
 The Calgary Flames, for Hall of Famer Lanny McDonald.
 The Chicago Blackhawks, for Hall of Famer Bobby Hull.
 The Dallas Stars, for Hall of Famer Mike Modano.
 The Detroit Red Wings, for Hall of Famer Gordie Howe.
 The Edmonton Oilers, for Hall of Famer Glenn Anderson.
 The Hartford Whalers, also for Gordie Howe. The number has been unofficially retired since the franchise moved to North Carolina in 1997.
 The Montreal Canadiens, for Hall of Famer Maurice Richard.
 The New York Islanders, for Hall of Famer Clark Gillies.
 The New York Rangers, for Hall of Famer Andy Bathgate and Adam Graves.
 The Toronto Maple Leafs, for Hall of Famers Ted Kennedy and Charlie Conacher.
 The first NHL incarnation of the Winnipeg Jets, also for Bobby Hull. The number has been returned to circulation since the franchise's relocation to Arizona, but it remains an honored number as part of the Arizona Coyotes "Ring of Honor".

NFL
 The Washington Commanders, for Hall of Famer Sonny Jurgensen.

Argentine Basketball League
 The Asociación Deportiva Atenas of Córdoba, for Marcelo Milanesio.

Peru Primera Football League
 The Club Universitario de Deportes of Lima, for Teodoro Fernandez.

Sweden Ice Hockey League
 The Karlstad Färjestad BK, for Ulf Sterner and Thomas Rundqvist.

10

Association football 
 Brescia, for Roberto Baggio.
 FAS, for Mágico González.
 Legia Warsaw, for Kazimierz Deyna.
 Napoli, for Diego Maradona in 2000.
 New York Cosmos, for Pelé in October 1977.

Basketball (FIBA) 
 Cibona, for Dražen Petrović
 Real Madrid Baloncesto, for Fernando Martín.

CFL 
 The Calgary Stampeders, for Willie Burden.
 The Hamilton Tiger-Cats, for Bernie Faloney.

Handball 
 The HSV Hamburg, for Oleg Velyky. After his death.

MLB
 The Atlanta Braves, for Chipper Jones.
 The Chicago Cubs, for Hall of Famer Ron Santo.
 The Cincinnati Reds, for Hall of Fame manager Sparky Anderson. The Detroit Tigers, for whom he managed more seasons, also retired his number, but he wore #11 in Detroit.
 The Kansas City Royals, for manager Dick Howser.
 The Minnesota Twins, for manager Tom Kelly.
 The Montreal Expos and Washington Nationals, for Rusty Staub and later for Hall of Famer Andre Dawson.
 The New York Yankees, for Hall of Famer Phil Rizzuto, who went on to spend four decades as a Yankees radio and TV broadcaster.
 The St. Louis Cardinals, for manager Tony La Russa.

NBA
 The Boston Celtics, for Jo Jo White.
 The Chicago Bulls, for Bob Love.
 The Detroit Pistons, for Hall of Famer Dennis Rodman. Greg Monroe, wore 10 when the Jersey was retired and was able to keep the number during his Pistons tenure.
 The Miami Heat, for Tim Hardaway.
 The New York Knicks, for Hall of Famer Walt Frazier, who also served as a Knicks broadcaster after his playing career.
 The Philadelphia 76ers, for Maurice Cheeks, who also served as the team's head coach.
 The Seattle SuperSonics and Oklahoma City Thunder, for Nate McMillan, who also served as the team's head coach.
 The Washington Wizards, for Hall of Famer Earl Monroe, who played for the team in its past incarnation as the Baltimore Bullets.

NFL
 The Atlanta Falcons, for Steve Bartkowski.
 The Minnesota Vikings, for Hall of Famer Fran Tarkenton.
 The New York Giants, for two-time Super Bowl Champion Eli Manning.

NHL
 The Carolina Hurricanes, for Hall of Famer Ron Francis.
 The Detroit Red Wings, for Hall of Famer Alex Delvecchio.
 The Montreal Canadiens, for Hall of Famer Guy Lafleur.
 The Toronto Maple Leafs, for Hall of Famers Syl Apps and George Armstrong.
 The Vancouver Canucks, for Hall of Famer Pavel Bure.

WNBA 

 The Houston Comets, for Kim Perrot

Finland Ice Hockey Liiga
 The Tappara, for Timo Susi.

Hungary Nemzeti Handball League
 The Veszprém KC, for Carlos Pérez.

India National Cricket Team 
 Sachin Tendulkar.

Lega Basket Serie A of Italy
 The Virtus Bologna, for Renato Villalta.

Nippon Professional Baseball
 The Hanshin Tigers, for Fumio Fujimura.

South Korea Baseball League 
 The Daegu Samsung Lions, for Yang Joon-hyuk.

11

CFL
 The Ottawa Redblacks, for Ron Stewart.

Handball-Bundesliga
 TBV Lemgo, for Volker Zerbe. When Zerbe became general manager of Lemgo he reactivated the number and gave it to Holger Glandorf.

MLB
 The Chicago White Sox, for Hall of Famer Luis Aparicio.
 The Cincinnati Reds, for Hall of Famer Barry Larkin.
 The Detroit Tigers, for Hall of Fame manager Sparky Anderson.
 The Los Angeles Angels, for Jim Fregosi, who played for the franchise during its first tenure as the Los Angeles Angels and after its renaming as California Angels, and also managed the California Angels.
 The New York Giants and San Francisco Giants, for Hall of Famer Carl Hubbell.
 The Pittsburgh Pirates, for Hall of Famer Paul Waner.
 The Seattle Mariners, for Hall of Famer Edgar Martinez.

NBA
 The Cleveland Cavaliers, for Zydrunas Ilgauskas.
 The Detroit Pistons, for Hall of Famer Isiah Thomas.
 The Sacramento Kings, for Hall of Famer Bob Davies.
 The Washington Wizards, for Hall of Famer Elvin Hayes.

NFL
 The New York Giants, for Phil Simms.

NHL
 The Buffalo Sabres, for Hall of Famer Gilbert Perreault.
 The Edmonton Oilers and New York Rangers, for Hall of Famer Mark Messier.
 The New York Rangers, for Vic Hadfield.
 The Ottawa Senators, for Daniel Alfredsson.
 The St. Louis Blues, for Brian Sutter.
 The Vancouver Canucks, unofficially retired for Wayne Maki.
 The Washington Capitals, for Hall of Famer Mike Gartner.

Argentine Basketball League
 The Asociación Deportiva Atenas of Córdoba, for Diego Osella.

Lega Basket Serie A of Italy
 The Olimpia Milano, for Dino Meneghin.

Nippon Professional Baseball
 The Hanshin Tigers, for Minoru Murayama.

Hungary Nemzeti Handball League
 The Veszprém KC, for István Csoknyai.

Lithuania Basketball League
 The BC Žalgiris, for Arvydas Sabonis.

Spain Basketball Liga
 The FC Barcelona Basquet, for Juan Carlos Navarro.

South Korea Baseball League
 The Lotte Giants of Busan, for Choi Dong-won.

12

CFL
 The Ottawa Redblacks, for Russ Jackson.

MLB
 The Tampa Bay Rays, for Hall of Famer Wade Boggs.
 The Toronto Blue Jays, for Hall of Famer Roberto Alomar.

NBA
 The New York Knicks, for Dick Barnett.
 The Cincinnati Royals and Sacramento Kings, for Hall of Famer Maurice Stokes.
 The Utah Jazz, for Hall of Famer John Stockton.

NFL
 The Buffalo Bills, for Hall of Famer Jim Kelly.
 The Dallas Cowboys, unofficially for Hall of Famer Roger Staubach.
 The Miami Dolphins, for Hall of Famer Bob Griese.
 The New York Jets, for Hall of Famer Joe Namath.
 The Philadelphia Eagles, unofficially for Randall Cunningham.
 The Pittsburgh Steelers, unofficially for Hall of Famer Terry Bradshaw.
 The San Francisco 49ers, for John Brodie.
 The Seattle Seahawks, for their fans (the "12th Man").

NHL
 The Calgary Flames, for Hall of Famer Jarome Iginla.
 The Detroit Red Wings, for Hall of Famer Sid Abel.
 The Montreal Canadiens, for Hall of Famers Yvan Cournoyer and Dickie Moore.
 The Vancouver Canucks, for Stan Smyl.
 The San Jose Sharks, for Patrick Marleau

Finland Ice Hockey Liiga
 The Tappara, for Erkki Lehtonen.

Kontinental Hockey League
 The HC Dynamo Moscow, for Igor Korolev.

Spain Basketball Liga
 The FC Barcelona Basquet, for Roberto Dueñas.

Colombian Football League
The Atlético Nacional of Medellín, for Alexis Henríquez.

13

CFL
 The Calgary Stampeders, for Mark McLoughlin.
 The Montreal Alouettes, for Anthony Calvillo.

MLB
 The Cincinnati Reds, for Dave Concepción.

NBA
 The Charlotte Hornets, for Bobby Phills, who died in a 2000 auto accident.
 The Golden State Warriors, Los Angeles Lakers, and Philadelphia 76ers, all for Hall of Famer Wilt Chamberlain.
 The Phoenix Suns, for Steve Nash.
 The Portland Trail Blazers, for Dave Twardzik.
 The San Antonio Spurs, for James Silas.

NFL
 The Miami Dolphins, for Hall of Famer Dan Marino.
 The New York Jets, for Hall of Famer Don Maynard.

NHL
 The Toronto Maple Leafs, for Hall of Famer Mats Sundin.

Greece Basketball League
 The Panathinaikos B.C., for Dimitris Diamantidis.

14

MLB
 The Boston Red Sox, for Hall of Famer Jim Rice.
 The Chicago Cubs, for Hall of Famer Ernie Banks.
 The Cincinnati Reds, for Pete Rose, who also managed the team.
 The Cleveland Guardians, for Hall of Fame player Larry Doby, who also managed the team when they were known as the Indians.
 The Minnesota Twins, for Kent Hrbek.
 The New York Mets, for Gil Hodges, who both played for and managed the team.
 The Philadelphia Phillies, for Hall of Famer Jim Bunning.
 The St. Louis Cardinals, for Ken Boyer.

NBA
 The Boston Celtics, for Hall of Famer Bob Cousy.
 The Golden State Warriors, for Tom Meschery, who played for the team as the Philadelphia and San Francisco Warriors.
 The Milwaukee Bucks, for Jon McGlocklin.
 The Portland Trail Blazers, for Lionel Hollins.
 The Sacramento Kings, for Hall of Famer Oscar Robertson, who played for the team when it was known as the Cincinnati Royals.
 The Utah Jazz, for Jeff Hornacek.

NFL
 The Cleveland Browns, for Hall of Famer Otto Graham.
 The Green Bay Packers, for Hall of Famer Don Hutson.
 The New York Giants, for Hall of Famer Y. A. Tittle.
 The San Diego Chargers, for Hall of Famer Dan Fouts.

NHL
 The Buffalo Sabres, for René Robert.
 The Toronto Maple Leafs, for Hall of Famer Dave Keon.

WNBA 

 The Houston Comets, for Cynthia Cooper

Nippon Professional Baseball
 The Yomiuri Giants of Tokyo, for Eiji Sawamura.

Kontinental Hockey League
 The HC Dynamo Moscow, for Sergei Svetlov.

Eredivisie of Netherland
 The Ajax Amsterdam, for Johan Cruyff.

15

CFL
 The BC Lions, for Willie Fleming.

MLB
 The New York Yankees, for Thurman Munson.
 The Philadelphia Phillies, for Dick Allen.

National teams
 The Kosovo national team, for Gazmend Sinani.

NBA
 The Boston Celtics, for Tom Heinsohn, a member of the Naismith Memorial Basketball Hall of Fame as both a player and coach for the team.
 The Dallas Mavericks, for Brad Davis.
 The Detroit Pistons, for Vinnie Johnson.
 The New York Knicks for Hall of Fame players Earl Monroe and Dick McGuire.
 The Philadelphia 76ers, for Hall of Famer Hal Greer.
 The Portland Trail Blazers, for Larry Steele.

NFL
 The Green Bay Packers, for Hall of Famer Bart Starr.
 The Philadelphia Eagles, for Hall of Famer Steve Van Buren.

NHL
 The Boston Bruins, for Hall of Famer Milt Schmidt.

Australia National Basketball League
 The Perth Wildcats, for Ricky Grace.

China Basketball Association
 The Beijing Ducks, for Zhang Yunsong.

Finland Ice Hockey Liiga
 The HC TPS of Turku, for Reijo Leppänen.

Nippon Professional Baseball
 The Hiroshima Carp, for Hiroki Kuroda.

Mexico Baseball League
 The Diablos Rojos del Mexico, for Salome Barojas.

Spain Basketball Liga
 The FC Barcelona Basquet, for Juan Antonio San Epifanio.

16

MLB
 The Chicago White Sox, for Hall of Famer Ted Lyons.
 The Detroit Tigers, for Hall of Famer Hal Newhouser.
 The Miami Marlins, for former pitcher José Fernández.
 The New York Yankees, for Hall of Famer Whitey Ford.

NBA
 The Boston Celtics, for Satch Sanders, a member of the Hall of Fame as a contributor to the sport.
 The Detroit Pistons and Milwaukee Bucks, both for Hall of Fame player Bob Lanier.
 The Golden State Warriors, for Al Attles.
 The Sacramento Kings, for Peja Stojaković

NFL
 The Kansas City Chiefs, for Hall of Famer Len Dawson.
 The New York Giants, for Hall of Famer Frank Gifford.
 The San Francisco 49ers, for Hall of Famer Joe Montana.

NHL
 The Boston Bruins, for Rick Middleton.
 The Buffalo Sabres, for Hall of Famer Pat LaFontaine.
 The Detroit Red Wings, unofficially retired for Vladimir Konstantinov.
 The Los Angeles Kings, for Hall of Famer Marcel Dionne.
 The Montreal Canadiens, for Hall of Famers Henri Richard and Elmer Lach.
 The Philadelphia Flyers, for Hall of Famer Bobby Clarke.
 The Quebec Nordiques, for Hall of Famer Michel Goulet. The number was returned to circulation after the franchise moved to Colorado in 1995.
 The St. Louis Blues, for Hall of Famer Brett Hull.
 The Vancouver Canucks, for Trevor Linden.

Finland Ice Hockey Liiga
 The HC TPS of Turku, for Rauli Tamelin

Nippon Professional Baseball
 The Yomiuri Giants of Tokyo, for Tetsuharu Kawakami.

Spain Handball League (Liga ASOBAL)
 The FC Barcelona Handbol, for David Barrufet.

17

FIA
 All Formula One teams, for Jules Bianchi, after his death from injuries sustained in the 2014 Japanese Grand Prix.

MLB
 The Colorado Rockies, for Todd Helton.
 The St. Louis Cardinals, for Hall of Famer Dizzy Dean, who also had a notable career as a broadcaster for the team.

NBA
 The Boston Celtics, for Hall of Famer John Havlicek.
 The Golden State Warriors, for Hall of Famer Chris Mullin.
 The Los Angeles Lakers, honored for Hall of Famer Jim Pollard of the Minneapolis Lakers.

NHL
 The Carolina Hurricanes, for Rod Brind'Amour.
 The Edmonton Oilers, for Hall of Famer Jari Kurri.
 The Toronto Maple Leafs, for Wendel Clark.

Kontinental Hockey League
 The HC CSKA Moscow, for Valeri Kharlamov.
 The HC Dynamo Moscow, for Vladimir Yurzinov and Zinetula Bilyaletdinov.

Sweden Ice Hockey League
 The Karlstad Färjestad BK, for Mathias Johansson.

18

CFL
 The Calgary Stampeders, for Allen Pitts.

Handball-Bundesliga
 The Rhein-Neckar Löwen, for Bjarte Myrhol.

MLB
 The Cincinnati Reds, for Ted Kluszewski.
 The Cleveland Guardians, for Mel Harder.

NBA
 The Boston Celtics, for Hall of Famer Dave Cowens.

NFL
 The Indianapolis Colts, for Peyton Manning.
 The Denver Broncos, for Frank Tripucka.
 The Kansas City Chiefs, for Hall of Famer Emmitt Thomas.

NHL
 The Buffalo Sabres, for Danny Gare.
 The Chicago Blackhawks, for Hall of Famer Denis Savard.
 The Montreal Canadiens, for Hall of Famer Serge Savard.
 The Los Angeles Kings, for Dave Taylor.

Lega Basket Serie A of Italy
 The Olimpia Milano, for Art Kenney.

South Korea Baseball League
 The Gwangju Kia Tigers, for Sun Dong-yol.

19

Association football
 VfL Wolfsburg, for Junior Malanda, who died in a car accident.

FIA
 All FIA Formula 2 Championship teams, for Anthoine Hubert, after his death from injuries sustained in the 2019 Spa-Francorchamps FIA Formula 2 round.

MLB
 The Chicago White Sox, for Billy Pierce.
 The Cleveland Guardians, for Hall of Famer Bob Feller.
 The Los Angeles Dodgers, for Jim Gilliam.
 The Milwaukee Brewers, for Hall of Famer Robin Yount.
 The San Diego Padres, for Hall of Famer Tony Gwynn.

NBA
 The New York Knicks, for Hall of Famer Willis Reed.

NFL
 The Baltimore Colts and Indianapolis Colts, for Hall of Famer Johnny Unitas.
 The San Diego Chargers, for Hall of Famer Lance Alworth.

NHL
 The Arizona Coyotes, for Shane Doan.
 The Colorado Avalanche, for Hall of Famer Joe Sakic.
 The Detroit Red Wings, for Hall of Famer Steve Yzerman.
 The Hartford Whalers, for John McKenzie. The number was returned to circulation after the franchise moved to North Carolina in 1997.
 The Minnesota North Stars, for Bill Masterton, the only NHL player to have died as a direct result of an injury suffered during an NHL game.
 The Montreal Canadiens, for Hall of Famer Larry Robinson.
 The New York Islanders, for Hall of Famer Bryan Trottier.
 The Vancouver Canucks, for Markus Näslund.

Czech Republic Ice Hockey League
 The HC Slavia Praha, for Josef Beranek.

20

MLB
 The Arizona Diamondbacks, for Luis Gonzalez.
 The Baltimore Orioles and Cincinnati Reds, both for Hall of Famer Frank Robinson.
 The Kansas City Royals, for Frank White.
 The Los Angeles Dodgers, for Hall of Famer Don Sutton.
 The New York Yankees, for Jorge Posada.
 The Philadelphia Phillies, for Hall of Famer Mike Schmidt.
 The Pittsburgh Pirates, for Hall of Famer Pie Traynor.
 The St. Louis Cardinals, for Hall of Famer Lou Brock.
 The San Francisco Giants, for Hall of Famer Monte Irvin, who played for the team when it was the New York Giants.

NBA
 The Portland Trail Blazers, for Maurice Lucas.

NFL
 The Detroit Lions, for Hall of Famer Barry Sanders.
 The New England Patriots, for Gino Cappelletti, who played for the team when it was known by its original name of the Boston Patriots.
 The Philadelphia Eagles, for Brian Dawkins.

NHL
 The Los Angeles Kings, for Hall of Famer Luc Robitaille.

Kontinental Hockey League
 The HC CSKA Moscow, for Vladislav Tretiak.

21

Liga Espanola
 The FC Barcelona, for Luis Enrique.

MLB
 The Cleveland Guardians, for Hall of Famer Bob Lemon.
 The Milwaukee Braves and Atlanta Braves, for Hall of Famer Warren Spahn.
 The New York Yankees, for Paul O'Neill.
 The Pittsburgh Pirates, for Hall of Famer Roberto Clemente, following his death in a plane crash while attempting to deliver humanitarian aid to victims of an earthquake in Nicaragua.

NBA
 The Atlanta Hawks, for Hall of Famer Dominique Wilkins.
 The Boston Celtics, for Hall of Famer Bill Sharman.
 The Detroit Pistons, for Hall of Famer Dave Bing.
 The Sacramento Kings, for Vlade Divac.
 The San Antonio Spurs, for Tim Duncan.

NFL
 The Los Angeles Chargers for LaDainian Tomlinson.
 The Washington Commanders, for Sean Taylor, who was murdered during a burglary attempt in 2007, when the team was known as the Redskins.

NHL
 The Chicago Blackhawks, for Hall of Famer Stan Mikita.
 The Colorado Avalanche, for Hall of Famer Peter Forsberg.
 The Pittsburgh Penguins, for Michel Brière.
 The Toronto Maple Leafs, for Hall of Famer Borje Salming.

Australia National Basketball League
 The Perth Wildcats, for Andrew Vlahov.

Sweden Ice Hockey League
 The Karlstad Färjestad BK, for Jörgen Jönsson.

22

Association football 
 Birmingham City, for Jude Bellingham.

CFL
 The BC Lions, for Joe Kapp.
 The Calgary Stampeders, for Tom Forzani.
 The Toronto Argonauts, for Dick Shatto.

Peru Primera Football League
 The Lima Universitario de Deportes, for José Luis Carranza.

Serbia SuperLiga
 The FK Partizan for Saša Ilić.

MLB
 The Baltimore Orioles, for Hall of Famer Jim Palmer.

NBA
 The Boston Celtics, for Hall of Famer Ed Macauley.
 The Cleveland Cavaliers, for Larry Nance.
 The Dallas Mavericks, for Rolando Blackman.
 The Houston Rockets and Portland Trail Blazers, both for Hall of Famer Clyde Drexler.
 The Los Angeles Lakers, for Hall of Famers Slater Martin and Elgin Baylor.
 The New York Knicks, for Hall of Famer Dave DeBusschere.

NFL
 The Indianapolis Colts, for Buddy Young, who played with the team when they were in Baltimore.
 The Dallas Cowboys, unofficially, for Hall of Famer Emmitt Smith.
 The Detroit Lions, for Hall of Famer Bobby Layne.

NHL
 The Boston Bruins, for Hall of Famer Willie O'Ree.
 The New York Islanders, for Hall of Famer Mike Bossy.

Colombian Football League
 The Deportivo Independiente Medellín, for David González.

South Korea Baseball League
 The Daegu Samsung Lions, for Lee Man-soo.

Sweden Ice Hockey League
 The Djurgårdens IF Hockey, for Håkan Södergren.

23

Association football
 Club Brugge, for François Sterchele who died in a car accident on May 8, 2008.
 Manchester City, following the death of Marc-Vivien Foé in 2003.

CFL
 The Saskatchewan Roughriders, for Ron Lancaster.

MLB
 The Chicago Cubs, for Ryne Sandberg.
 The Detroit Tigers, for Willie Horton.
 The New York Yankees, for Don Mattingly.

NBA
 The Atlanta Hawks, for Lou Hudson.
 The Chicago Bulls and Miami Heat, for Michael Jordan.
 The New Jersey Nets, for Drazen Petrovic.

NHL
 The Colorado Avalanche, for Milan Hejduk.
 The Montreal Canadiens, for Hall of Famer Bob Gainey.
 The New York Islanders, for Bob Nystrom.

Finland Ice Hockey Liiga
 The HC TPS of Turku, for Hannu Virta.

Nippon Professional Baseball
 The Hanshin Tigers, for Yoshio Yoshida.

24

MLB
 The Cincinnati Reds, for Hall of Famer Tony Pérez.
 The Houston Astros, for Jimmy Wynn.
 The Los Angeles Dodgers, for Hall of Fame manager Walter Alston.
 The Oakland Athletics, for Hall of Famer Rickey Henderson.
 The St. Louis Cardinals, for Hall of Fame manager Whitey Herzog.
 The San Francisco Giants, for Hall of Famer Willie Mays.
 The Seattle Mariners, for Hall of Famer Ken Griffey Jr.

NBA
 The Boston Celtics, for Hall of Famer Sam Jones.
 The Golden State Warriors, for Hall of Famer Rick Barry.
 The Los Angeles Lakers, for Hall of Famer Kobe Bryant.
 The New York Knicks, for Hall of Famer Bill Bradley.
 The Philadelphia 76ers, for Bobby Jones.
 The Phoenix Suns, for Tom Chambers.
 The Seattle SuperSonics, for Hall of Famer Spencer Haywood.

NFL
 The Baltimore Colts, for Hall of Famer Lenny Moore.

NHL
 The Boston Bruins, for Terry O'Reilly.
 The St. Louis Blues, for Hall of Famer Bernie Federko.

Kontinental Hockey League
 The HC CSKA Moscow, for Sergei Makarov.

Mexico Baseball League
 The Cancun Tigres de Quintana Roo, for Matias Carrillo.

25

MLB 
 The Cleveland Guardians, for Hall of Famer Jim Thome.
 The Houston Astros, for José Cruz.
 The San Francisco Giants, for Barry Bonds.

NHL
 The first NHL incarnation of the Winnipeg Jets, for Thomas Steen. The number has been returned to circulation since the franchise's relocation to Arizona, but it remains an honored number as part of the Arizona Coyotes "Ring of Honor".

England Premier Football League
 The Chelsea F.C., for Gianfranco Zola.

Sweden Ice Hockey League
 The Djurgårdens IF Hockey, for Mikael Johansson.

26

CFL
 The Ottawa Redblacks, for Whit Tucker.

MLB
 The Boston Red Sox, for Hall of Famer Wade Boggs.
 The Chicago Cubs, for Hall of Famer Billy Williams.
 The Los Angeles Angels of Anaheim, for founding owner Gene Autry.
 The Texas Rangers, for Johnny Oates.

NHL
 The Dallas Stars, for Jere Lehtinen.
 The New Jersey Devils, for Patrik Elias.
 The Quebec Nordiques, for Hall of Famer Peter Stastny. The number was returned to circulation after the franchise moved to Colorado in 1995.
 The Tampa Bay Lightning, for Hall of Famer Martin St. Louis.

Kontinental Hockey League
 The HC Dynamo Moscow, for Alexei Zhamnov.

27

Association Football
 AFC Bournemouth, for their fans that are situated in the North Stand.

CFL
 The Montreal Alouettes, for Mike Pringle.

MLB
 The Boston Red Sox, for Hall of Famer Carlton Fisk.
 The Oakland Athletics, for Hall of Famer Catfish Hunter.
 The San Francisco Giants, for Hall of Famer Juan Marichal.

NBA
 The Cincinnati Royals and Sacramento Kings, for Hall of Famer Jack Twyman.

NHL
 The Anaheim Ducks and New Jersey Devils, for Hall of Famer Scott Niedermayer.
 The Arizona Coyotes, for Teppo Numminen.
 The Toronto Maple Leafs, for Hall of Famers Frank Mahovlich and Darryl Sittler.

Sweden Ice Hockey League
 The Djurgårdens IF Hockey, for Thomas Eriksson.

28

CFL
 The Montreal Alouettes, for George Dixon.

MLB
 The Minnesota Twins, for Hall of Famer Bert Blyleven.

NFL
 The Chicago Bears, for Willie Galimore.
 The Kansas City Chiefs, for Abner Haynes.
 The New York Jets, for Hall of Famer Curtis Martin.
 The St. Louis Rams, for Hall of Famer Marshall Faulk.

NHL
 The Vancouver Canucks, unofficially retired for Luc Bourdon.

29

Association football
 S.L. Benfica, in memory of Miklós Fehér.

MLB
 The Atlanta Braves, for John Smoltz.
 The California Angels, now the Los Angeles Angels of Anaheim, and the Minnesota Twins, both for Hall of Famer Rod Carew.

NFL
 The Los Angeles Rams, for Hall of Famer Eric Dickerson.

NHL
 The Montreal Canadiens, for Hall of Famer Ken Dryden.

Kontinental Hockey League
 The HC Dynamo Moscow, for Mikhail Shtalenkov.

30

CFL
 The BC Lions, for Jim Young.

MLB
 The California Angels (now Los Angeles Angels of Anaheim), for Nolan Ryan, on June 16, 1992. Ryan is the only major league player to have his number retired by three different teams, though the other two teams retired number 34 for him rather than 30.
 The San Francisco Giants, for Orlando Cepeda.

NHL
 The Calgary Flames, for Mike Vernon.
 The Los Angeles Kings, for Hall of Famer Rogie Vachon.
 The New Jersey Devils, for Hall of Famer Martin Brodeur.
 The New York Rangers, for Henrik Lundqvist.

Australia National Basketball League
 The Perth Wildcats, for Scott Fisher.

Kontinental Hockey League
 The HC Dynamo Moscow, for Sergei Yashin.

31

Association football
 Queens Park Rangers F.C., for Ray Jones.

CFL
 The Toronto Argonauts, for Michael Clemons.

MLB
 The Atlanta Braves, also for Maddux.
 The Chicago Cubs, for Ferguson Jenkins and Greg Maddux.
 The New York Mets, for Mike Piazza.
 The San Diego Padres, for Dave Winfield.

NBA
 The Boston Celtics, for Cedric Maxwell.
 The Indiana Pacers, for Reggie Miller.

NFL
 The Atlanta Falcons, for William Andrews.
 The New Orleans Saints, for Jim Taylor.

NHL
 The Edmonton Oilers, for Hall of Famer Grant Fuhr.
 The New York Islanders, for Hall of Famer Billy Smith.
 The Philadelphia Flyers, unofficially retired for Pelle Lindbergh.

32

FIA
 Simtek teams, for Roland Ratzenberger, after his death from injuries sustained in the 1994 San Marino Grand Prix.

MLB
 The Houston Astros, for Jim Umbricht.
 The Los Angeles Dodgers, for Hall of Famer Sandy Koufax.
 The New York Yankees, for Elston Howard.
 The Philadelphia Phillies, for Hall of Famer Steve Carlton.
 The Toronto Blue Jays, for Roy Halladay.

NBA
 The Boston Celtics, for Hall of Famer Kevin McHale.
 The Brooklyn Nets, for Hall of Famer Julius Erving of the New York Nets.
 The Detroit Pistons, for Richard Hamilton.
 The Los Angeles Lakers, for Hall of Famer Magic Johnson.
 The Miami Heat, for Hall of Famer Shaquille O'Neal.
 The Milwaukee Bucks, for Brian Winters.
 The Philadelphia 76ers, for Hall of Famer Billy Cunningham.
 The Portland Trail Blazers, for Hall of Famer Bill Walton.
 The San Antonio Spurs, for Sean Elliott.
 The Seattle SuperSonics, for Fred Brown.
 The Utah Jazz, for Hall of Famer Karl Malone.

NFL
 The Buffalo Bills, unofficially for Hall of Famer O. J. Simpson.
 The Cleveland Browns, for Hall of Famer Jim Brown.
 The New York Giants, for Al Blozis, who left the team to serve with the United States Army in World War II and was killed in action in 1945.
 The Pittsburgh Steelers, for Hall of Famer Franco Harris.

NHL
 The Washington Capitals, for Dale Hunter.
 The Seattle Kraken, in recognition of the team being the 32nd to join the NHL and in honor of the 32,000 fans who placed deposits for tickets on the first possible day.

WNBA 

 The Charlotte Sting, for Andrea Stinson

33

MLB
 The Baltimore Orioles, for Hall of Famer Eddie Murray.
 The Houston Astros, for Mike Scott.
 The Pittsburgh Pirates, for Hall of Famer Honus Wagner.

NBA
 The Boston Celtics, for Hall of Famer Larry Bird.
 The Chicago Bulls, for Hall of Famer Scottie Pippen.
 The Denver Nuggets, for Hall of Famer David Thompson.
 The Los Angeles Lakers and Milwaukee Bucks, both for Hall of Famer Kareem Abdul-Jabbar.
 The Miami Heat, for Alonzo Mourning.
 The New York Knicks, for Hall of Famer Patrick Ewing.
 The Phoenix Suns, for Alvan Adams.

NFL
 The Kansas City Chiefs, for Stone Johnson, who died in 1963 from a neck fracture during a preseason game before he could play his first official game for the team.
 The Washington Commanders, for Hall of Famer Sammy Baugh.

NHL
 The Colorado Avalanche and Montreal Canadiens, both for Hall of Famer Patrick Roy.

Ukraine Association Football Premier League
 The FC Shakhtar Donetsk, for Dario Srna.

34

CFL
 The Saskatchewan Roughriders, for George Reed.

FIM
 Retired in honor of the 1993 MotoGP World Champion, Kevin Schwantz.

MLB
 The Boston Red Sox, for David Ortiz.
 The Houston Astros and Texas Rangers, both for Hall of Famer Nolan Ryan.
 The Minnesota Twins, for Hall of Famer Kirby Puckett.
 The Oakland Athletics and Milwaukee Brewers, both for Hall of Famer Rollie Fingers.

NBA
 The Houston Rockets, for Hall of Famer Hakeem Olajuwon.
 The Los Angeles Lakers, for Hall of Famer Shaquille O'Neal.
The Boston Celtics, for Paul Pierce.
The Philadelphia 76ers, for Hall of Famer Charles Barkley.

NFL
 The Buffalo Bills, for Hall of Famer Thurman Thomas.
 The Chicago Bears, for Hall of Famer Walter "Sweetness" Payton.
 The Houston Oilers and Tennessee Titans, for Hall of Famer Earl Campbell.

Nippon Professional Baseball
 The Yomiuri Giants of Tokyo, Masaichi Kaneda.

Mexico Baseball League
 The Sultanes de Monterrey, for Fernando Valenzuela.

35

MLB
 The Atlanta Braves, for Hall of Famer Phil Niekro.
 The Chicago White Sox, for 2014 Hall of Fame inductee Frank Thomas.
 The San Diego Padres, for Randy Jones.

NBA
 The Boston Celtics, for Reggie Lewis.
 The Indiana Pacers, for Roger Brown.
 The Utah Jazz, for Darrell Griffith.

NHL
 The Chicago Blackhawks, for Hall of Famer Tony Esposito.
 The New York Rangers, for Mike Richter.

36

CFL
 The Saskatchewan Roughriders, for Dave Ridgway.

MLB
 The Philadelphia Phillies, for Hall of Famer Robin Roberts.
 The San Francisco Giants, for Hall of Famer Gaylord Perry.

NBA
 The Portland Trail Blazers, for Lloyd Neal.

South Korea Baseball League
 The Daegu Samsung Lions, for Lee Seung-yeop.

37

MLB
 The New York Mets and the New York Yankees, for Hall of Fame manager Casey Stengel, the first manager to have had his number retired by two different teams.

NFL
 The Detroit Lions, for Doak Walker.
 The San Francisco 49ers, for cornerback Jimmy Johnson.

NHL
 The Florida Panthers, for founding owner Wayne Huizenga.

38

CFL
 The BC Lions, for Byron Bailey.

39

MLB
 The Brooklyn Dodgers (now Los Angeles Dodgers), for Roy Campanella.

NFL
 The Miami Dolphins, for Hall of Famer Larry Csonka.

NHL
 The Buffalo Sabres, for Hall of Famer Dominik Hašek.

FIM
 In the Moto2 class, for Luis Salom, after he crashed during practice for the Catalan Grand Prix.

40

CFL
 The Ottawa Redblacks, for Bruno Bitkowski.
 The Saskatchewan Roughriders, for Mel Becket.

MLB
 The Houston Astros, for Don Wilson.
 The Pittsburgh Pirates, for Danny Murtaugh, most noted as the team's longtime manager.

NBA
 The Denver Nuggets, for Byron Beck.
 The Detroit Pistons, for Bill Laimbeer.

NFL
 The Arizona Cardinals, for Pat Tillman.
 The Chicago Bears, for Hall of Famer Gale Sayers.
 The New England Patriots, for Hall of Famer Mike Haynes.
 The New York Giants, for Joe Morrison.
 The Philadelphia Eagles, for Tom Brookshier.

41

NBA
The Washington Wizards, for Wes Unseld.
The Dallas Mavericks, for Dirk Nowitzki.

MLB
 The Atlanta Braves, for Eddie Mathews.
 The New York Mets, for Tom Seaver.

NFL
 The Chicago Bears, for Brian Piccolo.

42

MLB
 All MLB teams, for Jackie Robinson.
 The New York Yankees, for Hall of Famer Mariano Rivera.
 The St. Louis Cardinals, for Bruce Sutter.

NBA
 The Los Angeles Lakers, for James Worthy.
 The Cleveland Cavaliers and Golden State Warriors, for Hall of Famer Nate Thurmond.

NFL
 The Chicago Bears, for Sid Luckman.
 The San Francisco 49ers, for Ronnie Lott.

43

FIA
 FIA World Rallycross Championship, for Ken Block

MLB
 The Oakland Athletics, for Dennis Eckersley.

NBA
 The Cleveland Cavaliers, for Brad Daugherty.

NFL
 The Houston Oilers, for Jim Norton.

44

CFL
 The Saskatchewan Roughriders, for Roger Aldag.

NBA
 The Denver Nuggets, for Dan Issel.
 The L.A. Lakers, for Jerry West.
 The Phoenix Suns, for Paul Westphal.
 The Sacramento Kings, for Sam Lacey.
 The San Antonio Spurs, for George Gervin.

MLB
 The Atlanta Braves and the Milwaukee Brewers, for Hank Aaron.
 The New York Yankees, for Reggie Jackson.
 The San Francisco Giants, for Willie McCovey.

NFL
 The Denver Broncos, for Floyd Little.
 The Philadelphia Eagles, for Pete Retzlaff.

45

MLB
 The Boston Red Sox, for Pedro Martinez. 
 The St. Louis Cardinals, for Bob Gibson.

46

MLB
 The New York Yankees, for Andy Pettitte.

MotoGP 
For Valentino Rossi

47

MLB 
 The Atlanta Braves, for  Hall of Famer Tom Glavine.
 The Detroit Tigers, for  Hall of Famer Jack Morris.

49

MLB
 The Houston Astros, for Larry Dierker.
 The New York Yankees, for Ron Guidry.

NFL
 The Washington Commanders, for Hall of Famer Bobby Mitchell.

50

MLB
 The Los Angeles Angels of Anaheim, for coach Jimmie Reese, who served with the team when it was known as the California Angels.

NBA
 The San Antonio Spurs, for Hall of Famer David Robinson.

 The Memphis Grizzlies, for Zach Randolph

NFL
 The New York Giants, for Hall of Famer Ken Strong.

51

MLB
 The Arizona Diamondbacks, for Hall of Famer Randy Johnson.
 The New York Yankees, for Bernie Williams.
 The San Diego Padres, for Hall of Famer Trevor Hoffman.

NFL
 The Carolina Panthers, for Hall of Famer Sam Mills.
 The Chicago Bears, for Hall of Famer Dick Butkus.

China Basketball Association
 The Beijing Ducks, for Ji Zhe.

Sweden Ice Hockey League
 The Karlstad Färjestad BK, for Rickard Wallin.

52

CFL
 The BC Lions, for Al Wilson.

NBA
 The Brooklyn Nets, for Buck Williams.
 The Los Angeles Lakers for Jamaal Wilkes.

NHL
 The Colorado Avalanche, for Adam Foote.

53

MLB
 The Los Angeles Dodgers, for Don Drysdale.

NBA
 The Utah Jazz, for Mark Eaton.

55

CFL
 The Calgary Stampeders, for Wayne Harris.
 The Saskatchewan Roughriders, for Mario DeMarco.
 The Toronto Argonauts, for Joe Krol.

NBA
 The Atlanta Hawks and the Denver Nuggets, for Dikembe Mutombo.

56

CFL
 The Montreal Alouettes, for Herb Trawick.
 The Saskatchewan Roughriders, for Ray Syrnyk.

MLB
 The Chicago White Sox, for Mark Buehrle.

58

NHL
 The Vegas Golden Knights, for the 2017 Las Vegas shooting victims.

FIM
 The number was retired following Marco Simoncelli's death in a crash, during the 2011 Malaysian Grand Prix. At the next and final round, Loris Capirossi wore his number as a tribute, however he was still listed as his usual #65 in the timing screens.

60

CFL
 The BC Lions, for Jamie Taras.
 The Ottawa Redblacks, for Jim Coode.
 The Toronto Argonauts, for Danny Nykoluk.

NFL
 The Philadelphia Eagles, for Hall of Famer Chuck Bednarik.

61

NHL
 The Columbus Blue Jackets, for Rick Nash.

62

CFL
The Ottawa Redblacks, for Moe Racine.

63

CFL
 The Montreal Alouettes, for Pierre Desjardins.

Czech Republic Ice Hockey League
 The HC Slavia Praha, for Josef Vasicek.

64

Australia National Cricket Team
 Phillip Hughes.

66

MLB 
 The Tampa Bay Rays, for Don Zimmer.

NFL
 The Green Bay Packers, for linebacker Ray Nitschke.

NHL
 The Pittsburgh Penguins, for Hall of Famer Mario Lemieux.

68

CFL
 The Hamilton Tiger-Cats, for Angelo Mosca.

69

MotoGP
 The MotoGP paddock has retired the number for Nicky Hayden, after he died of injuries sustained from a bicycle accident in May 2017.

70

CFL
 The Ottawa Redblacks, for Bobby Simpson.

NFL
 The NFL Officiating Department, for referee Jerry Seeman.
 The Philadelphia Eagles, for Al Wistert.

71

CFL 
 The Ottawa Redblacks, for Gerry Organ.

72

CFL 
 The Ottawa Redblacks, for Tony Golab.

MLB 
 The Chicago White Sox, for Carlton Fisk.

Czech Republic Ice Hockey League 
 The HC Slavia Praha, for Pavel Kolarik.

73

CFL
 The Saskatchewan Roughriders for Gordon Sturtridge.

NFL
 The New England Patriots, for John Hannah.
 The New York Jets, for Joe Klecko.
 The San Francisco 49ers, for Leo Nomellini.

74

CFL
 The Montreal Alouettes, for Peter Dalla Riva.

75

CFL
 The BC Lions, for Norm Fieldgate.
 The Calgary Stampeders, for Stu Laird.
 The Montreal Alouettes, for Hal Patterson.

76

Sweden Ice Hockey League
The HV71 of Jönköping, for Johan Davidsson.

77

CFL
 The Montreal Alouettes, for Junior Ah You.
 The Ottawa Redblacks, for Tony Gabriel.

NBA
 The Portland Trail Blazers, for the 1977 NBA title under coach Jack Ramsay.

NFL
 The Arizona Cardinals, for Stan Mauldin.
 The Chicago Bears, for Red Grange.
 The Indianapolis Colts, for Jim Parker.
 The Minnesota Vikings, for Korey Stringer.

NHL
 The Boston Bruins and the Colorado Avalanche, for Hall of Famer Ray Bourque.

Hungary Association Football Nemzeti Liga
 The Diosgypsi VTK of Miskolc. for Jose Juan Luque.

Nippon Professional Baseball
 The Tohoku Rakuten Eagles of Sendai, for Senichi Hoshino.

78

CFL
 The Montreal Alouettes, for Virgil Wagner.

NFL
 The Buffalo Bills, for Hall of Famer Bruce Smith.

80

NFL
 The San Francisco 49ers, for Jerry Rice

81

CFL
 The BC Lions, for Geroy Simon.

85

MLB
 The St. Louis Cardinals for the former owner August Busch, Jr.

86

CFL
The Montreal Alouettes, for Ben Cahoon.

88

NHL
 The Philadelphia Flyers, for Hall of Famer Eric Lindros.

NFL
 The Arizona Cardinals, for J.V. Cain.

89

NFL
 The Baltimore Colts, now the Indianapolis Colts, for Gino Marchetti.
 The Boston Patriots, now the New England Patriots, for Bob Dee.
 The Chicago Bears, for Mike Ditka.

90

NFL
 The New York Jets, for Dennis Byrd.

92

CFL
 The Montreal Alouettes, for Sam Etcheverry.

NFL
 The Green Bay Packers and Philadelphia Eagles, for Hall of Famer Reggie White.

93

NHL
 The Florida Panthers, for the team's first president Bill Torrey.
 The Toronto Maple Leafs, for Hall of Famer Doug Gilmour.

97

CFL
 The BC Lions, for Brent Johnson.

NHL
 The Arizona Coyotes, for Jeremy Roenick.

Czech Republic Ice Hockey League
 The HC Slavia Praha, for Vladimir Ruzicka.

99

NFL
 The Chicago Cardinals, now the Arizona Cardinals for Marshall Goldberg.
 The Philadelphia Eagles, for Jerome Brown.

NHL
 The Edmonton Oilers, the Los Angeles Kings, and all NHL teams, for Hall of Famer Wayne Gretzky.

110

Liga MX Association Football League
 The C.F. Pachuca, for Andrés Chitiva.

455 
 The Cleveland Guardians, in honor of 455 straight sellouts for games the team played as the Indians.

See also
:Category:Sportspeople with retired numbers
List of Canadian Football League retired numbers
List of Major League Baseball retired numbers
List of National Basketball Association retired jersey numbers
List of National Football League retired numbers
List of National Hockey League retired numbers
List of retired numbers in association football

References

 
Terminology used in multiple sports

Sports culture
Sports Numbers
Numbering in sports